Charles Henri Malfroy (15 January 1895 – 27 April 1945) was a French painter. His work was part of the painting event in the art competition at the 1928 Summer Olympics. A member of the French Resistance during the Second World War, Malfroy was arrested and died in Buchenwald concentration camp. He was posthumously awarded the Order of Liberation.

References

External links
 

1895 births
1945 deaths
20th-century French painters
20th-century French male artists
French male painters
Olympic competitors in art competitions
People from Martigues
French Resistance members
Resistance members who died in Nazi concentration camps
French people who died in Buchenwald concentration camp
French civilians killed in World War II
Recipients of the Order of Liberation